Letitia de Jong (born 5 March 1993) is a Dutch former speed skater who specialized in the sprint distances.

Career
In January 2018 she won the silver medal at the team sprint event of the 2018 European Championships in Kolomna, Russia, partnering Mayon Kuipers and Sanneke de Neeling. That same month she won the national title at the KNSB Dutch Sprint Championships. This result qualified her for the 2018 World Sprint Speed Skating Championships in Changchun, China, in March where she finished eighth.

De Jong was a member of Team IKO.

Records

Personal records

World records

Tournament overview

sSource:

World Cup overview

Source:

 DQ = Disqualified
 – = Did not participate
 (b) = Division B
 GWC = Grand World Cup

References

External links

 
 Team IKO profile
 

1993 births
Living people
Dutch female speed skaters
Sportspeople from Rotterdam
World Single Distances Speed Skating Championships medalists
21st-century Dutch women